The political career of Arnold Schwarzenegger began in 2003, when Arnold Schwarzenegger entered politics for the first time by running for Governor of California in a recall election. He was subsequently elected Governor when then-Governor Gray Davis was successfully recalled and served the remainder of Davis' term between 2003 and 2007. Schwarzenegger was then reelected to a second term in 2006 to serve his first full term between 2007 and 2011. Schwarzenegger was unable to run for a third term due to term limits imposed by Constitution of California, but has still been involved in politics and the promotion of environmentalism.

Early politics 

In Austria, Schwarzenegger was officially a member of the youth weightlifting team of the Austrian People's Party (ÖVP).

In 1985, Schwarzenegger appeared in "Stop the Madness", an anti-drug music video sponsored by the Reagan administration. He first came to wide public notice as a Republican during the 1988 presidential election, accompanying then-Vice President George H. W. Bush at a campaign rally.

Governor of California

First term

Second term

Later politics 
On January 27, 2011, Schwarzenegger mistakenly praised Canadian soldiers serving in Iraq, even though they did not.

On October 4, 2012, Schwarzenegger said Republican presidential nominee Mitt Romney performed better than President Barack Obama in the first debate.

On August 23, 2014, Schwarzenegger and other Hollywood stars expressed their support for Israel and criticized Hamas for the "devastating loss of life endured by Israelis and Palestinians in Gaza".

On March 6, 2016, Schwarzenegger endorsed Ohio Governor John Kasich for the Republican nomination for president, saying his experience in government made him "an action hero". On June 7, Schwarzenegger's spokesperson Daniel Ketchell told Los Angeles Times''' Seema Mehta on Twitter that Schwarzenegger voted for Kasich in the California Republican primary, even though Kasich already suspended his campaign. On October 8, Schwarzenegger announced that he would not vote for Donald Trump to be president. The statement was made one day after the release of the Donald Trump Access Hollywood tape.

On January 30, 2017, Schwarzenegger criticized Trump's executive order to ban travel by refugees and immigrants from seven countries, saying that it makes the United States look "stupid". On June 23, Schwarzenegger met with French President Emmanuel Macron to discuss environmental issues and vowed to "make the planet great again". On August 17, Schwarzenegger criticized Trump for his response to the Unite the Right rally and terrorist attack that took place in Charlottesville, Virginia, and gave a speech that he said Trump should have given. One day before the Austrian legislative election, Schwarzenegger wished Sebastian Kurz and the ÖVP good luck on October 14. After meeting with Paris mayor Anne Hidalgo on December 11, Schwarzenegger said, "We must talk about the health aspects [of climate change]".

After Chad Mayes, the former Republican minority leader of the California State Assembly, announced on January 9, 2018, the formation of New Way California, an initiative that aims to expand the appeal of Republican policies and reverse the party's declining prospects in the state, Daniel Ketchell said, "[Schwarzenegger is] committed to helping Chad find a way to reinvigorate the party so it can help all Californians."

With Republican governor Larry Hogan of Maryland, Schwarzenegger spoke out on the need to end gerrymandering in the United States on July 11, 2019.

On January 10, 2021, Schwarzenegger shared a Twitter video message condemning the 2021 storming of the United States Capitol. He further called Trump a "failed leader" and "the worst president ever".

In late March 2021, Schwarzenegger was interviewed by Politico about the upcoming recall election in California in which he said that "it's pretty much the same atmosphere today as it was then", and when he was asked about Newsom's claim of this being a "Republican recall" he responded that "this recall effort is sparked by ordinary folks, and that this isn't a power grab by Republicans."

 Legacy 
In an article of Time on November 1, 2010, Thad Kousser of the University of California, San Diego said, "[Schwarzenegger] is not divisive nor scandal plagued, but he's generally fallen short of changing the political culture of Sacramento and the policy course of the state." Nick Roman of KPCC wrote that Schwarzenegger's legacy is varied and puzzling, inspiring, and infuriating—just like the state he governed.

 Political philosophy 
 In his own words 
Schwarzenegger is a member of the Republican Party and, in September 2012, told Lesley Stahl on 60 Minutes that he will never leave the party. On September 7, 2007, Schwarzenegger said, "I am proud to be a member of the party of Abraham Lincoln. I am proud to be a member of the party of Ronald Reagan." In the documentary, Pumping Iron, Schwarzenegger said, "I was always dreaming about very powerful people—dictators and things like that. I was just always impressed by that...people could be remembered for hundreds of years, you know—even Jesus for thousands of years remembered." In August 2003, Schwarzenegger said that he was not a cultural conservative. Schwarzenegger believes that Austrian social democracy limited the horizons of many of his friends.

At the 2004 Republican National Convention, Schwarzenegger spoke about the reason he became a Republican instead of a Democrat:

 As described by others 
Thal mayor and longtime schoolmate Peter Urdl said that the teenage Schwarzenegger seemed to hold opinions in line with the Social Democrats and expressed admiration for Bruno Kreisky. The New Yorker's Connie Bruck called Schwarzenegger "supermoderate". Andrew Gumbel of The Independent wrote, "[Schwarzenegger is] a man of surprises. He mixes in the social circles of Hollywood's liberal elite...yet he has always regarded himself as a staunch Republican—among other things, an act of rebellion against the staunch social democratic values of his native Austria." Los Angeles Times writer Joe Mathews wrote that Schwarzenegger routinely sides with business and asserts quasi-libertarian views on individual freedom but has crossed borders and associated with groups whose experiences seem foreign to his own. Daniel Weintraub of the San Francisco Chronicle wrote, "[Schwarzenegger] is liberal on some issues, conservative on others and, sometimes, but not always, in the middle." Rob Long, a television writer and producer, wrote on NPR that Schwarzenegger is a "Hollywood Republican, meaning he's mellow about gays and abortion and marijuana".

Civil rights attorney Shannon Minter of the National Center for Lesbian Rights gave Schwarzenegger a B− grade on gay and lesbian issues, calling his decision not to appeal Perry v. Schwarzenegger'', which struck down Proposition 8, "a really quite dramatic stand for a Republican governor to have taken."

Scales and rankings 
In October 2003, On the Issues rated Schwarzenegger as a "moderate liberal populist". In April 2008, the organization reclassified Schwarzenegger as a "centrist". In a 2010 report published by Equality California, an LGBT rights organization, Schwarzenegger received a 57 percent score. On April 21, 2010, Citizens for Responsibility and Ethics in Washington named Schwarzenegger and ten other governors as the "worst governors", accusing him of self-enrichment; cozying up with special interests, conflicts of interest, cronyism, pressuring state officials, mismanagement, and vetoing hospital transparency bills.

In 2004, the California League of Conservation Voters, an environmental organization, released a scorecard giving Schwarzenegger a 58%. Schwarzenegger would receive the same score in 2005. In 2006, his score fell to 50%. Schwarzenegger's score improved to 63% in 2007. In 2008, Schwarzenegger received a 60% score. In 2009, Schwarzenegger's score from the CLCV fell to its lowest ever, falling to 28%. However, Schwarzenegger's score would recover in 2010, improving to 56%. As Governor of California, Schwarzenegger's lifetime score from the CLCV is 53%.

In March 2005, the Cato Institute, an American libertarian think tank, issued a "fiscal policy report card" for 2004 in which it assigned an A grade to Schwarzenegger's performance as governor. Schwarzenegger was given a D grade in the 2006 report card from the Cato Institute. In the 2008 report card, Schwarzenegger was given a C grade. In 2010, Schwarzenegger received a D grade in the report card.

Electoral history

See also 
 Opinion polling on the Arnold Schwarzenegger governorship

References

Further reading

External links 
 

2000s in California
Arnold Schwarzenegger
Schwarzenegger, Arnold
Schwarzenegger, Arnold
Schwarzenegger, Arnold